NGC 7070 is a spiral galaxy located about 100 million light-years away in the constellation of Grus. It has a close companion galaxy called NGC 7070A. NGC 7070 was discovered by astronomer John Herschel on September 5, 1834. 

NGC 7070 is a member of a group of galaxies known as the NGC 7079 Group.

See also 
 NGC 7083

References

External links 

Unbarred spiral galaxies
Grus (constellation)
7070
66869
Astronomical objects discovered in 1834
NGC 7079 Group